Nils Nordberg (born 26 March 1942, in Verdal) is a Norwegian crime writer, anthology editor and audio play director. He has worked for the Norwegian Broadcasting Corporation since 1969, and for Radioteatret since 1973. He is regarded among Norway's leading experts on crime fiction.

References

1942 births
Living people
People from Verdal
NRK people
20th-century Norwegian novelists
21st-century Norwegian novelists
Norwegian crime fiction writers
Norwegian theatre directors